Lasiopetalum fitzgibbonii is a species of flowering plant in the family Malvaceae and is endemic to the south-west of Western Australia. It is an erect, spreading shrub with hairy stems, needle-shaped leaves and blue, purple or pink flowers.

Description
Flowering occurs from September to November.

Taxonomy
Lasiopetalum fitzgibbonii was first formally described in 1882 by Ferdinand von Mueller in the journal Southern Science Record from specimens collected by George Maxwell "in the back-scrubs of the country at King George's Sound". The specific epithet (fitzgibbonii) honours Edmund Gerald FitzGibbon who "invariably exercised his extensive influence in also promoting scientific objects in our midst."

Distribution and habitat
This lasiopetalum grows on undulating plains and hills in the Avon Wheatbelt, Coolgardie, Esperance Plains and Mallee biogeographic regions of south-western Western Australia.

Conservation status
Lasiopetalum fitzgibbonii is listed as "Priority Three" by the Government of Western Australia Department of Biodiversity, Conservation and Attractions, meaning that it is poorly known and known from only a few locations but is not under imminent threat.

References

fitzgibbonii
Malvales of Australia
Flora of Western Australia
Plants described in 1882
Taxa named by Ferdinand von Mueller